The 1992 Nigerian Senate election in Ogun State was held on July 4, 1992, to elect members of the Nigerian Senate to represent Ogun State. Monsurudeen Osholake representing Ogun Central, Ayodeji Otegbola representing Ogun West and Jubril Martins-Kuye representing Ogun East all won on the platform of the Social Democratic Party.

Overview

Summary

Results

Ogun Central 
The election was won by Monsurudeen Osholake of the Social Democratic Party.

Ogun West 
The election was won by Ayodeji Otegbola of the Social Democratic Party.

Ogun East 
The election was won by Jubril Martins-Kuye of the Social Democratic Party.

References 

Ogu
Ogun State Senate elections
July 1992 events in Nigeria